Central State University (CSU) is a public, historically black land-grant university in Wilberforce, Ohio.  It is a member-school of the Thurgood Marshall College Fund.

Established by the state legislature in 1887 as a two-year program for teacher and industrial training, it was originally located with Wilberforce University, a four-year institution devoted to classical academic education.  It was originally   known as the Combined Normal and Industrial Department. In 1941 the college gained a four-year curriculum, independent status in 1947, and was renamed as Central State College in 1951. With further development, it gained university status in 1965. In 2014, Central State University received designation as a land-grant university.

History
Central State University started in 1887 as a two-year normal and industrial department funded by the state. It was first located at Wilberforce University, a historically black college in southern Ohio that was owned and operated by the African Methodist Episcopal Church. In 1941, its curriculum was expanded to a four-year program emphasizing teacher education. In 1947, it was separated from the university, and in 1951 renamed as Central State College. In 1965, with further development, it achieved university status.

Wilberforce University had been founded in 1855 jointly by the Cincinnati Conference of the Methodist Episcopal Church in collaboration with the AME Church; they had a biracial group of trustees to manage it, including founders Bishop Daniel A. Payne and Salmon Chase, then governor of Ohio. By 1860 the college, based on a classical education, had 200 students, mostly the mixed-race children of wealthy Southern planters. With the advance of the Civil War, most of the southerners were pulled out of the school, and it was forced to close in 1862. The Methodist Church felt it could not support it financially given the demands of the war.

The African Methodist Episcopal (AME) Church purchased the facility and reopened the college in 1863, the first to be owned and operated by African Americans.

In 1887, the Ohio General Assembly enacted legislation to create the Combined Normal and Industrial Department at Wilberforce, to provide training for primary teachers in a model common in the United States, and vocational education. This department operated as part of Wilberforce University, but a separately appointed board of trustees governed the state-financed operations. This arrangement allowed state legislators to sponsor scholarship students at the university and brought other forms of useful state financial aid to the school. The administration struggled to maintain its initial emphasis on classical education as well, and allowed students to take classes in both sections.

In 1941 the Normal and Industrial Department expanded from a two-year to a four-year program. In 1947, it was legally split from Wilberforce University and was renamed as the College of Education and Industrial Arts at Wilberforce, Ohio. In 1951, it was renamed Central State College. With further development, in 1965 the institution achieved university status.

In 1974, half the campus was destroyed in a severe tornado. The university struggled to rebuild, but has since re-established itself and achieved recognition by the state of Ohio (three Centers of Excellence), with new academic degree programs in Agriculture, Sustainable Ag and Exercise Science, and national recognition as the 2017 HBCU of the Year and for its Summer Banking Institute (HBCU Digest). Central State University is and has always been open to all students of every ethnicity, background, religion, etc. and continues to attract students from across the country and internationally.

Academics
Central State University is accredited by the Ohio Department of Education, the North Central Association of Colleges and Schools, the Accreditation Board for Engineering and Technology, the National Association of Schools of Art and Design, Accreditation Council for Business Schools and Programs and the National Association of Schools of Music.

In 2011, the annual cost of all fees and tuition at Central State University was about $11,500. The college has on-campus housing for about 1,700 students, at $4,000 annually.

Colleges
Central State operates five colleges: the John W. Garland College of Engineering, Science, Technology and Agriculture, College of Education, College of Humanities Arts and Social Sciences, College of Business, and Honors College.

Faculty and staff

Presidents

The current president is Jack Thomas.

Campus

A branch campus (CSU-Dayton) is located in Dayton.

Adjacent to the main campus is an outdoor education area, a natural reserve. Within a hundred yards of the Robeson Center is the National Afro-American Museum and Cultural Center, operated by the Ohio Historical Society.

Student housing
The campus housing complex, which houses approximately 1,700 students, consists of eight residence halls: Hunter Hall (co-ed), Williamson Hall (co-ed), Green Hall (upperclassmen male), Anderson Hall (upperclassmen male), Fox Hall (co-ed honors), Harry-Johns Hall (co-ed honors), Foundation Hall (freshmen females), Foundation Hall II (co-ed upperclassmen) and most recently added fall 2019, the Marauder Pride Community, an apartment style complex (co-ed upperclassmen), which also houses a 10,000-square-foot Wellness Center.

Benjamin Banneker Science Hall and the University Student Center
Banneker Hall was originally constructed in 1950 with an addition completed in 1967, Banneker Hall housed science laboratories and a botanical laboratory and greenhouse. The building was demolished in fall 2010 to make way for the University Student Center, a 85,000-square-foot complex housing a 500-seat cafeteria, two ballrooms, bookstore, computer lab, administrative offices and recreational spaces, which opened in the fall of 2015.

Beacom/Lewis Gymnasium
Constructed in 1961, Beacom Gymnasium is the home of the Marauders volleyball and basketball teams and provides office space for the Department of Health, Physical Education and Recreation. The original Beacom Gymnasium constructed in 1919 was destroyed by fire in 1971. The natatorium was constructed in 1966.

Hallie Q. Brown Library/Clara A. Henderson Hall College of Education
The Library/College of Education building was completed in 1985 and houses the main library, classrooms, and offices for the College of Education. The library portion of the building is named in honor of long-time educator and public speaker Hallie Q. Brown. The College of Education is named for teacher, department chairperson and dean, Dr. Clara A. Henderson. In 2019, the library was updated with new technology and remodeled to support various forms of collaborative study.

CSU Mass Communication Center
CSU Mass Communication Center, formerly The Cosby Center houses the university's telecommunications programs (including radio, television and print journalism) and the campus-based radio station WCSU-FM. It was constructed in 1958 and named the Lucinda Cook Laboratory Demonstration School.

Galloway/Alumni Tower The Galloway Tower/Walter G. Sellers Alumni
The facility houses the offices of the CSU General Alumni Association. The building was named in honor of Dr. William Galloway, a physician who served as a member of the Board of Trustees of the Combined Normal and Industrial Department. It was rebuilt following the 1974 tornado that destroyed the original Galloway Hall. Funds to reconstruct the tower were raised by alumni and friends of Central State University. During the university's centennial celebration in 1987, the Alumni Center was named in honor of Walter G. Sellers Sr., a 1951 CSU graduate.

Jenkins Technology Education Building
Home of the Department of Manufacturing and Industrial Engineering, the building is named in honor of Carl C. Jenkins, a superintendent of the Combined Normal and Industrial Department. An earlier building, constructed in 1941, was also named for Jenkins and housed the Physical Education Department, Army ROTC, and Bookstore and Grill. Destroyed in 1974, the original Jenkins Hall housed the audio-visual department, the campus radio station, the bookstore, and office of the CSU Federal Credit Union at the time.

The C.J. McLin International Center for Water Resources Management
Three programs are housed in the facility opened in 1987: Water Resources Management, Geology, and Earth Sciences.

Lackey/Lee Health Center The Lackey/Lee Health Center
Opened in 1978, the center houses administrative offices, examination and treatment rooms, and laboratory facilities. It replaced the former campus health center, also named for Dr. Lackey and earlier known as Tawawa Hospital, which was among the buildings destroyed in 1974. The building is named for Dr. Harry M. Lackey (university physician from 1921 to 1953), Bishop Benjamin F. Lee (president of Wilberforce University from 1876 to 1884), Benjamin F. Lee Jr. (a faculty member), and Benjamin F. Lee III (physician who served the campus and the community).

McPherson Memorial Stadium
McPherson Stadium is home to the Marauder football and track and field teams. Originally constructed in 1949, the structure has been renovated to expand and modernize the locker room, training room, and office spaces. It is named in honor of Combined Normal and Industrial Department graduate William Patrick McPherson, who was killed in action in World War II.
Lionel H. Newsom Administration Building
The administration building was dedicated in 1978 and named in honor of Dr. Lionel H. Newsom, president of Central State from 1972 to 1985. It was constructed on the remaining portion of the Hallie Q. Brown Memorial Library, heavily damaged in the 1974 tornado. The building houses administrative and financial offices, the administrative computer center, and the Office of the Registrar.

Paul Robeson Cultural and Performing Arts Center
The Paul Robeson Cultural and Performing Arts Center houses the art and music departments, classrooms, and studios. It was dedicated in 1978 in honor of the singer, actor, activist and winner of the Stalin Peace Prize, Paul Robeson. The building includes an 850-seat auditorium and a recital hall. A large sculpture of Robeson in front of the center was commissioned by Camille and William Cosby.

Charles S. Smith College of Business
Smith Hall was completed in 1970 and named in honor of Charles S. Smith, founder of the College of Business Administration. It houses the College of Business Administration's classrooms and laboratories and an academic computer center.

Norman E. Ward Sr. University Center
The building houses a bookstore, commuter lounge, and office spaces for the Admissions Department, Financial Aid Department, Career Services Department, Student Government Association and the Dean of Students. It is named for 1950 graduate, Norman Ward Sr., an outstanding athlete, teacher, coach, and administrator.

Charles H. Wesley Hall
Wesley Hall houses the College of Arts and Sciences' administrative offices, classrooms and offices. It is named in honor of Central State University's first president, Charles H. Wesley (1941 to 1965).

Joshua I. Smith Center for Education and Natural Sciences
Houses the School of Education and Natural Sciences department of the College of Arts and Sciences. In 2016 it was named after 1963 alum Joshua I. Smith, a retired executive from Caterpillar Inc., who continues to support the university through the College of Business and the university radio station, WCSU.

Athletics 

Central State athletic teams are the Marauders and Lady Marauders. The university is a member of the Division II level of the National Collegiate Athletic Association (NCAA), primarily competing in the Southern Intercollegiate Athletic Conference (SIAC) since the 2015–16 academic year (with football joining first as an affiliate member from 2013–14 to 2015 before upgrading for all sports). The Marauders and Lady Marauders previously competed in the D-II Great Midwest Athletic Conference (G-MAC) from 2012–13 to 2014–15, and as an NCAA D-II Independent from 2002–03 to 2011–12; as well as competing in the American Mideast Conference of the National Association of Intercollegiate Athletics (NAIA) from 2000–01 to 2001–02.

Central State competes in 11 intercollegiate varsity sports: Men's sports include basketball, cross country, football, track & field (indoor and outdoor) and volleyball; while women's sports include basketball, cross country, track & field (indoor and outdoor) and volleyball.

Rivalries
CSU's main athletic rivals are the Kentucky State Thorobreds and Thorobrettes and the West Virginia State Yellow Jackets.

Staff
The current athletic director is Tara A. Owens.

Student activities

Student organizations
There are approximately 30 student organizations operating on campus. These student organizations are classified under six categories: Academic, Business, Special Interest, Religions, Honorary and Greek letter organizations. The Office of the University Center and Student Development in conjunction with the SGA's Inter organization Committee monitors the recognized student organizations activities.

Student Government Association
The Student Government Association (SGA) serves as a liaison between the students and the administration, sharing decision making responsibility with the faculty and staff on matters that affect campus life. The SGA also oversees many student activities, represents the student body, and serves as an advisory body.

Greek Letter organizations
All nine of the National Pan-Hellenic Council organizations currently have chapters at Central State University. These organizations are governed by the Central State University's chapter of the National Pan-Hellenic Council and overseen by the Director of the University Center and Student Development.

Invincible Marching Marauders
The Central State University bands are under the direction of Professor Blake K. Gaines. The Invincible Marching Marauders appeared in Dave Chappelle's Block Party.

University Chorus
The Central State University Chorus has twice been nominated for a Grammy Award for its recordings.

Notable alumni

References

External links

 
 Official athletics website

 
Buildings and structures in Greene County, Ohio
Education in Greene County, Ohio
Educational institutions established in 1887
Historically black universities and colleges in the United States
Public universities and colleges in Ohio
Land-grant universities and colleges
1887 establishments in Ohio